Amran District  is a district of the 'Amran Governorate, Yemen. As of 2003, the district had a population of 96,375 inhabitants. The capital lies at `Amran.

References

Districts of 'Amran Governorate
Amran District